Charles John Corfe  (1843 – 20 June 1921) was the inaugural Anglican Bishop in Korea from 1889 to 1904.

Biography 
Corfe was one of the four "Bible Clerks" educated as an undergraduate at All Souls College, Oxford. After graduating he had a brief spell teaching at St. Michael's College, Tenbury before being ordained in 1866. For the next 22 years he was a Royal Naval Chaplain.

On All Saints' Day (1 November) 1889 he was consecrated by Edward White Benson, Archbishop of Canterbury, as missionary bishop of Chosun (Korea, then spelled Corea) in Westminster Abbey and was awarded an honorary DD on his appointment in Korea. In 1890, he established the Church of St Michael and All the Angels in Seoul and started three hospitals, two in Seoul and one in Jemulpo (Incheon). Until 1891, he was also the bishop of Manchuria before the area was converted to the Chinese diocese of North China. In 1897, he baptized the first Anglicans and performed the ritual in Korean. He tendered his resignation to the Archbishop of Canterbury shortly before St James's Day (25 July) 1904, when he wrote a letter to his diocese; by 16 September, the Archbishop had accepted Corfe's resignation and named Arthur Turner his successor. On his retirement he published an account of his pioneering efforts entitled The Anglican Church in Corea.

References

Korean bishops
1843 births
1921 deaths
People educated at Lancing College
Royal Navy chaplains
Alumni of All Souls College, Oxford
British expatriates in Korea
Anglican bishops in Korea